The 1935–36 Toronto Maple Leafs season was Toronto's 19th season in the National Hockey League (NHL). The Maple Leafs made it to the Stanley Cup Final, losing 3–1 to the Detroit Red Wings.

Offseason

Regular season

Final standings

Record vs. opponents

Schedule and results

Playoffs
Won Quarter-final (Total goals: 8–6) versus Boston Bruins
Won Semi-final (2–1) versus New York Americans

Final

In the Stanley Cup Final, the Leafs lost a best-of-five series 3–1 to the Detroit Red Wings.

Player statistics

Regular season
Scoring

Goaltending

Playoffs
Scoring

Goaltending

Awards and records

Transactions
September 29, 1935: Traded Hec Kilrea to the Detroit Red Wings for $7,500 and Future Considerations
October 7, 1935: Signed Free Agent Norman Mann
October 9, 1935: Traded Baldy Cotton to the New York Americans for cash
October 15, 1935: Acquired Mickey Blake and Fido Purpur in the Dispersal Draft from the St. Louis Eagles
October 22, 1935: Signed Free Agents George Parsons, Jack Howard and Jimmy Fowler
November 6, 1935: Traded Fido Purpur to the St. Louis Flyers of the AHA for cash
January 15, 1936: Traded Flash Hollett to the Boston Bruins for $16,000
January 20, 1936: Loaned Jack Markle from the Syracuse Stars of the IHL

See also
1935–36 NHL season

References

External links
 

Toronto Maple Leafs seasons
Toronto
Toronto